The term or program name University Scholars may refer to:

University Scholars at the Pennsylvania Leadership Charter School
University Scholars Programme at the National University of Singapore